Joe Amisano (1917–2008) was an American architect, especially known for his work in Atlanta. Born in New York, he graduated from Pratt Institute in 1940 and won a Prix de Rome in 1950.  He joined the Atlanta firm that became Toombs, Amisano and Wells in 1954.

Works
 Lenox Square mall (1958)
 Regency Square Mall (Jacksonville) (1967)
 Woodruff Arts Center (Atlanta Memorial Arts Building) (1968)
 Unitarian Universalist Congregation of Atlanta (1968)
 Peachtree Summit (1975)
 Peachtree Center (MARTA station) (1982-1983)
 Robert W. Woodruff Library, Atlanta University Center (1983)

References

1917 births
2008 deaths
Architects from New York (state)
Pratt Institute alumni